Vickrama Cinkaiariyan was the fourth of the Aryacakravarti kings of Jaffna Kingdom. Author of the book “Ancient Jaffna” C. Rasanayagam calculated that he has been ruled Jaffna from 1279 to 1302 (23 years). Yalpana Vaipava Malai says during his rule the county was in disorder. Riot occurred between Sinhalese and Tamils. Vickrama Cinkaiariyan ordered death sentences 17 Sinhalese and imprisoned many Sinhalese after the murder of 2 Tamils.

Mayilvagana Pulavar, the author of Yalpana Vaipava Malai, described the event;

Notes

References
 Yalpana Vaipava Malai

Kings of Jaffna
Sri Lankan Tamil royalty